Maximino León Molina (born February 4, 1950 in Acula, Veracruz, Mexico) is a Mexican former pitcher in Major League Baseball who played from  through  for the Atlanta Braves. Listed at 5' 10", 145 lb., he batted and threw right-handed.

MLB career 
In a six-season MLB career, León posted a 14–18 record with 170 strikeouts and a 3.71 ERA in 162 appearances, including 13 starts, two complete games, one shutout, 13 saves, and 310.1 innings of work.

Mexican career 
León had an extensive career in the Mexican League, playing for the Charros de Jalisco, Alacranes de Durango, Piratas de Campeche, Diablos Rojos del México, Tecolotes de Nuevo Laredo, Tabasco, Leones de Yucatán and Rieleros de Aguascalientes in the Liga Mexicana de Beisbol, and the Naranjeros de Hermosillo and Tomateros de Culiacán in the Mexican Pacific League. He was elected to the Mexican Baseball of Fame in 1997.

See also
List of players from Mexico in Major League Baseball

Sources

Mexican Baseball Hall of Fame
Retrosheet

1950 births
Alacranes de Campeche players
Alacranes de Durango players
Atlanta Braves players
Baseball players from Veracruz
Charros de Jalisco players
Charros de Puerto México players
Diablos Rojos del México players
Ganaderos de Tabasco players
Leones de Yucatán players
Living people
Major League Baseball pitchers
Major League Baseball players from Mexico
Mexican Baseball Hall of Fame inductees
Mexican expatriate baseball players in the United States
Mexican League baseball pitchers
Mineros de Fresnillo players
People from Veracruz
Porteños de Puerto México players
Richmond Braves players
Rieleros de Aguascalientes players
Savannah Braves players
Tecolotes de los Dos Laredos players